Florin Vasile Achim (born 16 July 1991) is a Romanian professional football player who plays as a right back  or right midfielder.

Career
Achim started playing football in his hometown as a youngster for FC Baia Mare. In 2010 FC Baia Mare has dissolved and he joined the newborn FC Maramureș Baia Mare. During 2012 Achim was loaned to the second team of Astra Giurgiu. He returned to FC Maramureș and played for his team until it was dissolved, in 2013. In June 2013 Achim signed a contract with the first league team Săgeata Năvodari, after being spotted at a trial by their manager, Tibor Selymes. Săgeata Năvodari relegated in 2014 and Achim moved back in Transilvania at Universitatea Cluj.

Career statistics

Club

Honours
FC Maramureș Baia Mare
Liga III : 2010–11

Universitatea Cluj
 Cupa României runner-up: 2014–15

References

External links
 
 

1991 births
Living people
Sportspeople from Baia Mare
Romanian footballers
Association football midfielders
Liga I players
FC Astra Giurgiu players
AFC Săgeata Năvodari players
FC Universitatea Cluj players
Liga II players
CS Minaur Baia Mare (football) players
FC Olimpia Satu Mare players
LPS HD Clinceni players
FK Bregalnica Štip players
CS Gaz Metan Mediaș players
Liga Leumit players
Hapoel Petah Tikva F.C. players
Hapoel Nir Ramat HaSharon F.C. players
FC Steaua București players
Romanian expatriate footballers
Expatriate footballers in Israel
Expatriate footballers in North Macedonia
Romanian expatriate sportspeople in Israel
Romanian expatriate sportspeople in North Macedonia